Pronto Airways LP was an airline formed in 2006 that was based in Saskatoon, Saskatchewan, Canada. 
It operated scheduled and charter passenger services as well as cargo service until the airline ceased operations in 2015. Its main bases were Prince Albert and Saskatoon, with destinations throughout northern Saskatchewan and Nunavut.

History 
Pronto Airways began operating air services on February 1, 2006 serving Prince Albert, Points North Landing, Wollaston Lake, and La Ronge.  On March 15, 2006, service was extended to Saskatoon and Stony Rapids.

In 2015, Pronto's cargo and passenger services were absorbed into those of its parent company, West Wind Aviation, effectively discontinuing the Pronto name. Pronto Airways' fleet consisted of one Beechcraft King Air and three Beechcraft 1900Cs. The King Air and two of the 1990Cs were repainted and continue to fly under the West Wind banner.

Destinations 
Destinations as of June 30, 2009

 Nunavut
Baker Lake (Baker Lake Airport)
Rankin Inlet (Rankin Inlet Airport)
Saskatchewan
Fond-du-Lac, Saskatchewan (Fond-du-Lac Airport)
Points North (Points North Landing Airport)
Prince Albert (Prince Albert (Glass Field) Airport)
Saskatoon (Saskatoon John G. Diefenbaker International Airport)
Stony Rapids (Stony Rapids Airport)
Uranium City (Uranium City Airport)
Wollaston Lake (Wollaston Lake Airport)
Regina  (Regina International Airport)

See also 
 List of defunct airlines of Canada

References

External links 
Pronto Airways

Regional airlines of Saskatchewan
Air Transport Association of Canada
Airlines established in 2006
Companies based in Saskatoon
Regional airlines of Nunavut
2006 establishments in Saskatchewan
Defunct airlines of Canada
Defunct companies of Saskatchewan